Conor Harrington (born 1980) is an Irish street/graffiti artist based in London, England.

Overview 
Harrington is known for both his street work and also more recently his gallery work.

Early life
Conor Harrington was born in Cork, Ireland, in 1980. He started his career in his teenage years tagging and doing graffiti in the streets of Ireland. Most of these nights were called hip-hop nights, where he would hang out at clubs in 1990s Ireland.

Career
Conor Harrington attended Limerick School of Art and Design and graduated in 2002 with his Bachelor of Fine Arts.

In 2013, Harrington participated in the Dulwich Outdoor Gallery project, initiated by Ingrid Beazley of Dulwich Picture Gallery.

Exhibitions
Conor Harrington's exhibitions have included the following.

Solo exhibitions
 "Eat and Delete", Lazarides pop-up, New York (2014)
 "Whole Lot of Trouble for a Little Win", The Outsiders, London (2013)
 "Dead Meat", Lazarides Rathbone, London (2012)
 "Headless Heroes", Lazarides Rathbone, London (2009)
 "Weekend Warriors", The Outsiders London (2008)

Group exhibitions
 Hang-Up Collections Volume III, Hang-Up Gallery, London (2015)
 Spring Group Show, Mead Carney Fine Art, London (2015)
 Art Truancy: Celebrating 20 Years of Juxtapoz Magazine, Jonathan LeVine Gallery, New York (2014)
 Brutal, Lazarides Gallery, London (2013)
 Twente Biënnale, Twente Biënnale, Enschede (2013)
 Bedlam, Lazarides pop-up, Old Vic Tunnels, London (2012)
 The Minotaur, Lazarides pop-up, Old Vic Tunnels, London (2011)
 Inside Sir Paul Smith – His Art, His Photography, His World Daelim Museum of Contemporary Art (2010)
 Euro Trash, Lazarides pop-up, Los Angeles (2010)
 The Outsiders, The New Art Gallery, Walsall (2009)
 The Outsiders New York, Lazarides pop-up, New York (2008)
 Outsiders, Lazarides Rathbone, London (2008)

References

Sources
 "Conor Harrington Biography". lazinc.com.
 "Conor Harrington Biography". streetartbio.com.
 "Conor Harrington". artsy.net.
 "Conor Harrington: Stakes Is High" . December 1, 2016. juxtapoz.com.
 "Interview: Artist Conor Harrington Discusses How Hip-Hop and Fallen Empires Inspired His "Eat and Delete" Exhibition in New York". October 3, 2014. complex.com.

External links
 Conor Harrington website
 
 Conor Harrington on Instagram

1980 births
Living people
People from Cork (city)
Irish graffiti artists
Irish expatriates in the United Kingdom
Street artists
British graffiti artists
Artists from London